The Wirye–Sinsa Line is a future subway line scheduled to open in 2024, in Seoul, South Korea. Construction is scheduled to begin in 2021.

Stations 
The names of the stations are not yet final.

Planned extension to Hanam by Hanam City

References 

Seoul Metropolitan Subway lines